Bourges is a city in central France which is capital of the department of Cher.

Bourges may also refer to:

People

Surname
 Élémir Bourges (1852-1925), French novelist
 Julián Bourges (before 1944 - 1976), Argentinian film actor
 Maurice Bourgès-Maunoury (1914-1993), French politician
 Yvon Bourges (1921-2009), French politician and colonial administrator

Other people
 Arcadius of Bourges (died 549), French bishop
 Felix of Bourges (died ), French bishop
 Odo Arpin of Bourges ( – ), French viscount, crusader and monk
 Patroclus of Bourges ( – 576), French ascetic and saint
 Sulpitius I of Bourges (died 591), French bishop
 Ursinus of Bourges (3rd or 4th century), French bishop and saint

Topics associated with the city
 Arrondissement of Bourges
 Bourges 18, an association football club
 Bourges Airport
 Bourges Cathedral
 Communauté d'agglomération Bourges Plus
 Council of Bourges, a church council of 1225
 Bourges station, a railway station
 Cantons of Bourges, administrative units
 CJM Bourges Basket, a women's basketball club
 Paris–Bourges, a road bicycle race
 Pragmatic Sanction of Bourges, a decree issued by King Charles VII of France in 1438
 Printemps de Bourges, an annual music festival
 Live Printemps de Bourges 2002, an album by Jean-Michel Jarre
 Roman Catholic Archdiocese of Bourges
 Timeline of Bourges
 University of Bourges

See also
 Boulton Paul Bourges, a series of British prototype twin-engined biplane day bombers 1918-24
 Bourge, a surname